Mandsaur district is a District of Madhya Pradesh state in central India. The town of Mandsaur is the administrative headquarters of the district.The ancient Pashupatinath temple is situated in Mandsaur. Large quantities of opium are produced in Mandsaur district.

Origin of name
The District takes its name from the headquarters town, Mandsaur. It is considered to have been evolved from Marhsaur, originating from Marh and Saur or Dasaur, two of the villages which merged in the town. The town was known as Dashpur during ancient times. Other etymology claims it derives from Mandodari, wife of Ravana, who is said to have been born in the district.

Geography
The district is present on the border of the Mewar and Malwa so the culture is the combination of the both regions, and is bounded by Neemuch District to the north west, Chittorgarh district 
to North east, Kota district and Jhalawar district to east and Pratapgarh District, and Ratlam District to the south. It is part of Ujjain Division.

Mandsaur District forms the northern projection of Madhya Pradesh from its western Division, i.e., Ujjain Commissioner's Division. It lies between the parallels of latitude 230 45' 50" North and 250 2' 55" North, and between the meridians of longitude 740 42' 30" East and 750 50' 20" East.

The district is an average-size district of Madhya Pradesh.

Climate
The climate of this district is generally dry except in south-west monsoon. Year may be divided into four seasons. The cold season is from December to February. This is followed by the hot season from March to the middle of June. Thereafter the south-west monsoon season starts and continues up to about the middle of September.

The rainfall in the districts in the region round about Sitamau- Mandsaur- Malhargarh, and in general increases in the northern part of the district from the west towards the east.

In the district there is rapid increase in temperatures after February. Days are intensely hot in summer and hot dust-laden winds which below during this season add to the discomfort. On individual days in the summer session and in June before the onset of the monsoon the day temperatures often go up above .

Industry
Opium production and the slate pencil industry are important to the district's economy. Some parts of the district have wind farms.

Divisions
The district is divided into four sub divisions and eight tehsils. The sub divisional headquarters are at Mandsaur, Malhargarh, Sitamau and Garoth. Where, Mandsaur, Malhargah, Garoth, Shamgarh, Dalauda, Bhanpura, Suwasra and Sitamau are eight tehsils of District.

Vehicle number plates beginning with MP-14 are identified as a registered vehicle under the properly followed rules and regulations.

Demographics

According to the 2011 census Mandsaur District has a population of 1,340,411, roughly equal to the nation of Mauritius or the US state of Maine. This gives it a ranking of 361st in India (out of a total of 640). Its population growth rate over the decade 2001-2011 was 13.19%. Mandsaur has a sex ratio of 966 females for every 1000 males, and a literacy rate of 72.75%. 20.71% of the population lives in urban areas. Scheduled Castes and Scheduled Tribes make up 18.58% and 2.47% of the population respectively.

At the time of the 2011 Census of India, 49.13% of the population in the district spoke Hindi and 48.58% Malvi as their first language.

Culture
The temple of Lord Pashupatinath is located on the bank of the Shivna. The most common language is mixture of Mewari and Malwi (Rajasthani).

References

External links
Mandsaur District web site

 
Districts of Madhya Pradesh